Norton Allan Schwartz (born December 14, 1951) is a retired United States Air Force General who served as the 19th Chief of Staff of the Air Force from August 12, 2008, until his retirement in 2012. He previously served as commander, United States Transportation Command from  September 2005 to August 2008. He is currently the president and CEO of the Institute for Defense Analyses, serving since January 2, 2020.

Background
Schwartz grew up in Toms River, New Jersey, The first Jewish Chief of Staff of the Air Force, Schwartz was a member of the U.S. Air Force Academy Jewish choir before his 1973 graduation. In 2004, Schwartz was awarded the Jewish Community Center's Military Leadership Award. In accepting the award, Schwartz said he was "proud to be identified as Jewish as well as an American military leader."

Military career
Schwartz graduated from the United States Air Force Academy in 1973. He is an alumnus of the National War College, a member of the Council on Foreign Relations, and a 1994 Fellow of the Massachusetts Institute of Technology's Seminar XXI. He has served as commander of the U.S. Special Operations Command Pacific, as well as Alaskan Command, Alaskan North American Aerospace Defense Command Region and the 11th Air Force.

Schwartz is a USAF Command Pilot with more than 4,400 flying hours in a variety of aircraft. He has flown C-130 Hercules and MC-130 Combat Talon I and Combat Talon II aircraft and MH-53 Pave Low III and Pave Low IV, and MH-60 Black Hawk and Pave Hawk special ops helicopters.  His operational background goes back to the final days of the Vietnam War; at the time, he was a crew member taking part in the 1975 airlift evacuation of Saigon. By 1991 he was chief of staff of the Joint Special Operations Task Force for Northern Iraq during the first Gulf War. He participated as a crew member in the 1975 airlift evacuation of Saigon, and in 1991 served as chief of staff of the Joint Special Operations Task Force for Northern Iraq in operations Desert Shield and Desert Storm. In 1997, he led the Joint Task Force that prepared for the noncombatant evacuation of U.S. citizens in Cambodia. On January 12, 2000, Schwartz was promoted to lieutenant general and received his third-star upon assuming the command of Alaskan Command and Eleventh Air Force.

September 11 Attacks 
During the September 11, 2001 Attacks General Schwartz at that time was the commander of Alaskan Command, a joint subordinate unified command of North American Aerospace Defense Command (NORAD) which oversee the state of Alaska. At that time of the attacks all of air-traffics above The United States Airspace was grounded and most of the flight are diverted to Canada as part of the Operation Yellow Ribbon in response of the attacks. However one aircraft, a Korean Air Boeing 747-400 Flight 85 which en route to Anchorage International Airport for stopover with final destination to New York, John F. Kennedy International Airport, suddenly reported being hijacked and transmitting the international hijack transponder code. Lieutenant General Schwartz who was in-charge of Alaskan Command at that time ordered to scrambled two F-15s aircraft in-order to intercept the Korean Air Flight 85 and order the F-15 pilot to then established direct radio contact with the Korean Air Flight 85 pilot.

Schwartz then contact the commander in charge of the Canadian NORAD region, Lieutenant General Angus Watt and discuss the possibility of diverting the Korean Air 747 into Whitehorse, Canada since the 747 was running low on fuel and headed into U.S. Territory. Schwartz also guaranteed that the Korean Air 747 will be escorted by U.S. Air Force fighter aircraft all the way until the plane touchdown. Upon receiving approval from the Canadian authority, Watts then allowed the Korean Air Boeing 747 to land on  Whitehorse International Airport in condition that the plane have to be escorted by the United States Air Force until its land on Whitehorse International Airport. Immediately after landing on Whitehorse International Airport, the Korean Air Flight 85 Boeing 747 was surrounded by The Royal Canadian Mounted Police and the crew was interrogated by the Canadian authority. It was later confirmed that in-fact, it was not a hijacking, but rather a mistaken signal which was transmitted by the Korean Air Flight 85 pilot. Many praise Schwartz decision in-coordinating with the Canadian Authority in-order to divert the Korean Air Flight 85 into Whitehorse, Canada which eventually saving the lives of 215 passengers on board the Korean Air Flight 85. At that time during the September 11 Attacks all the Air Force Fighter Aircraft which was scrambled and patrolled around the United States Airspace was given the order to shoot down all aircraft that was suspected being hijacked and had the potential to be used to attack several important locations within the United States, knowing that it was hijacked distress signal that was sent by the Korean Air Flight 85 pilot.

Director of the Joint Staff 
In October 2002 following the assignment within the Alaskan Command, Lieutenant General Schwartz was promoted into Joint Staff J-3 director for operations which assists the Chairman of The Joint Chiefs of Staff about the current United States Armed Forces operations and plans. In this capacity Schwartz was the senior officer of the Operation Directorate and providing guidance for the Unified Combatant Commanders for every U.S. military operation around the world. In October 2004, following two years assignment as J-3 Operations Directorate, Schwartz was appointed by Chairman of The Joint Chiefs of Staff General Richard B. Myers to be the Director of the Joint Staff (DJS). In this position Schwartz became the three-star officers which assists the Chairman of The Joint Chiefs of Staff in managing the Joint Staff and headed all of the Joint Staff Directorate.

Commander of the United States Transportation Command 

Schwartz was appointed to be The commander of the United States Transportation Command (TRANSCOM) in 2005. Schwartz also received his fourth-star and was promoted into four-star General. As commander of The Transportation Command, General Schwartz oversees the mobilization of all of the service branches and defense agencies transportation and mobility support. General Schwartz also organized the entire Department of Defense transportation network. During his tenured as TRANSCOM Commander General Schwartz also coordinated with commercial airline in cooperation for providing military airlift. Schwartz also held a routine meetings with the Airline CEO in-order to discuss about the Airline company cooperation with the military and the Department of Defense. As a result, many cargo and chartered airline companies help provided so many airlift for military personnel and logistical supports during the Iraq War and War in Afghanistan.

Schwartz also emphasize about the importance of the movement of injured warfighters from the battlefield to medical treatment facilities in-order for them to get immediate and quickly medical treatment. Especially knowing that this was a complex process in which it required close collaboration with doctors, hospitals and evacuation crews. One of General Schwartz major accomplishment as commander of The Transportation Command was the successfully of The United States Transportation Command to transported over 9,900 patients from the United States Central Command area of responsibility which was the key-element area during the Iraq War, War in Afghanistan and War on Terrorism and over 16,000 patients globally to a medical treatment facilities. In 2008 following three years of his tenure as Commander of The United States Transportation Command, General Schwartz was actually set to retired from active-duty. However following the nuclear weapons incident in 2007 which resulted in the relieved of Air Force Chief of Staff General T. Michael Moseley, Schwartz was elevated into the position of The United States Air Force Chief of Staff and named his successor.

Air Force Chief of Staff 

In June 2008, after General T. Michael Moseley was relieved from his position as Air Force Chief of Staff, Secretary of Defense Robert Gates nominated General Schwartz to be the next Air Force Chief of Staff. General Schwartz is the first Air Force Chief of Staff with a background as an airlift and special operations aircraft pilot. It is speculated that Secretary of Defense Robert Gates selected him because he did not have a background as a fighter or bomber pilot.

As chief of staff, General Schwartz served as the senior uniformed Air Force officer responsible for the organization, training and equipping of nearly 700,000 active-duty Air Force, Air Force Reserve, Air National Guard and civilian forces serving in the United States and overseas. As a member of the Joint Chiefs of Staff, General Schwartz functioned as a military adviser to the Secretary of Defense, National Security Council and the President.

During his tenure as Air Force Chief of Staff, General Schwartz reaffirmed the importance of Unmanned Aerial Vehicles (UAV), which he believed could be the future of the Air Force. At that time dozens of UAVs were being used in the war on terror, especially in Afghanistan. General Schwartz also estimated that in the future, 85 percent of Unmanned Aerial Vehicles would have a huge role within the Air Force and its operations. In 2011 almost 350 UAV pilots were trained and prepared by the Air Force.

Air-Sea Battle Doctrine 
Together with Chief of Naval Operations Admiral Gary Roughead, General Schwartz developed a new battle doctrine in 2010, The Air-Sea Battle Doctrine. The Air-Sea Battle Doctrine was an Air Force and Navy integrated battle doctrine which formed a key component military strategy. The Air-Sea Battle Doctrine was developed to deal with the unique challenges of the Western-Pacific arena. It created an institutional partnership and cooperation between the United States Air Force and the United States Navy. Both General Schwartz and Admiral Roughead saw the need and importance of joint Air Force and Navy cooperation within the Indo-Pacific region that ultimately lead to the initiation of Air-Sea Battle Doctrine, especially in wartime situations within the Indo-Pacific region.

One of the primary goals of Air-Sea Battle Doctrine was interoperability of air and naval forces that could execute networked and integrated in-depth attacks in order to disrupt, destroy and ultimately cripple or defeat the enemy's anti-access/area denial capabilities to sustain and protect the operations area within the Indo-Pacific Region. General Schwartz also emphasized the importance of the air-sea operating space for non-combat operations such as disaster relief. General Schwartz argued that to ensure the success of this doctrine, improved training, tactics and communications technologies between the Air Force, Navy and Marines, would be needed to allow them to work together better, during both wartime and non-combatant operations.

The concept to create a joint Air Force and Navy battle strategy began in the 1990s, when both the Air Force and Navy had institutionalized a joint air operations which eventually led the two services to began exchanging air crews, tacticians and intelligence officers in a joint service partnership following the Gulf War. It created a new cooperative environment that balanced the differences in naval (carrier-based) and Air Force (land-based) air operations, strengthened command and staff relationships, integrated air asset strike operations, and pooled common air resources. In February 2010 the Air-Sea Battle Doctrine became official and in 2015 The Air-Sea Battle doctrine was renamed to Joint Concept for Access and Maneuver in the Global Commons (JAM-GC).

In August 2012, General Schwartz retired after serving four years as Air Force Chief of Staff; he had served a total of 39 years with the Air Force. General Schwartz was succeeded by General Mark A. Welsh who previously served as commander of United States Air Forces in Europe and Africa.

Civilian career 
After his retirement from the Air Force, he wrote a memoir entitled Journey: Memoirs of an Air Force Chief of Staff with Susie Schwartz and Ronald Levinson.

In 2013, Schwartz became a member of the board of trustees of the Institute for Defense Analyses.  In July 2019, Schwartz was selected to become IDA's president and CEO, effective January 2, 2020.

Education
1973 Bachelor of Science degree in political science and international affairs, United States Air Force Academy, Colorado Springs, Colorado
1977 Squadron Officer School, Maxwell AFB, Alabama
1983 Master of Business Administration degree, Central Michigan University, Mount Pleasant, Michigan
1984 Armed Forces Staff College, Norfolk, Virginia
1989 National War College, Fort Lesley J. McNair, Washington, D.C.
1994 Fellow, Seminar XXI, Massachusetts Institute of Technology, Cambridge, Massachusetts

Assignments

August 1973 – September 1974, student, undergraduate pilot training, Laughlin AFB, Texas
October 1974 – January 1975, student, C-130 initial qualification training, Little Rock AFB, Arkansas
February 1975 – October 1977, C-130E aircraft commander, 776th and 21st Tactical Airlift Squadrons, Clark Air Base, Philippines
October 1977 – December 1977, student, Squadron Officer School, Maxwell AFB, Alabama
December 1977 – October 1979, C-130E/H flight examiner, 61st Tactical Airlift Squadron, Little Rock AFB, Arkansas
October 1979 – November 1980, intern, Air Staff Training Program, Office of the Deputy Chief of Staff for Plans, Operations and Readiness, Headquarters U.S. Air Force, Washington, D.C.
November 1980 – July 1983, MC-130E flight examiner, 8th Special Operations Squadron, Hurlburt Field, Florida
July 1983 – January 1984, student, Armed Forces Staff College, Norfolk, Virginia
January 1984 – April 1986, action officer, Directorate of Plans, Office of the Deputy Chief of Staff for Plans and Operations, Headquarters, U.S. Air Force, Washington, D.C.
May 1986 – June 1988, commander, 36th Tactical Airlift Squadron, McChord AFB, Washington
August 1988 – June 1989, student, National War College, Fort Lesley J. McNair, Washington, D.C.
July 1989 – July 1991, director of plans and policy, Special Operations Command Europe, Patch Barracks, Stuttgart-Vaihingen, Germany
August 1991 – May 1993, deputy commander for operations and commander, 1st Special Operations Group, Hurlburt Field, Florida
May 1993 – May 1995, deputy director of operations, later, deputy director of forces, office of the deputy chief of staff for plans and operations, Headquarters, U.S. Air Force, Washington, D.C.
June 1995 – May 1997, commander, 16th Special Operations Wing, Hurlburt Field, Florida
June 1997 – October 1998, commander, Special Operations Command, Pacific, Camp H.M. Smith, Hawaii
October 1998 – January 2000, director of strategic planning, deputy chief of staff for plans and Programs, Headquarters U.S. Air Force, Washington, D.C.
January 2000 – September 2000, deputy commander in chief, U.S. Special Operations Command, MacDill AFB, Florida
September 2000 – October 2002, commander, Alaskan Command, Alaskan North American Aerospace Defense Command Region and 11th Air Force, Elmendorf AFB, Alaska.
October 2002 – October 2004, director for operations, the Joint Staff, Pentagon, Washington, D.C.
October 2004 – August 2005, Director, the Joint Staff, Pentagon, Washington, D. C.
September 2005 – August 2008, commander, U.S. Transportation Command, Scott AFB, Illinois
August 2008 – August 2012, chief of staff, Headquarters, U.S. Air Force, Washington, D.C.

Flight information
Rating: command pilot.
Flight hours: more than 4,400.
Aircraft flown: C-130E/H, MC-130E/H/P, HC-130, AC-130H/U, YMC-130, MH-53 and MH-60.

Awards and decorations

Effective dates of promotion

Gallery

References

External links

Official USAF Biography

1951 births
Air University (United States Air Force) alumni
Jewish American military personnel
United States Air Force personnel of the Gulf War
Central Michigan University alumni
Joint Forces Staff College alumni
Living people
Massachusetts Institute of Technology fellows
Military personnel from New Jersey
National War College alumni
People from Toms River, New Jersey
Recipients of the Defense Superior Service Medal
Recipients of the Legion of Merit
United States Air Force Academy alumni
United States Air Force generals
Chiefs of Staff of the United States Air Force
Recipients of the Defense Distinguished Service Medal
Recipients of the Air Force Distinguished Service Medal
Toms River High School South alumni
21st-century American Jews